Becoming the Beach Boys: The Complete Hite & Dorinda Morgan Sessions is a compilation album recorded by American rock band the Beach Boys and released by Omnivore Recordings in 2016. It was originally recorded in 1961 and in 1962. Some of the tracks were previously unreleased. The album followed the release of James Murphy's 2015 biography, also titled Becoming the Beach Boys.

Track listing

Disc one
"Surfin"
(Demo)
(Takes 1–2)
(Take 3)
(Take 4)
(Take 5)
(Take 6)
(Take 7)
(Take 8)
(Master)

"Luau"
(Demo – Take 1)
(Demo – Take 2)
(Demo – Take 3)
(Takes 1–2)
(Takes 3, 5–6)
(Take 7)
(Take 8–11)
(Take 12)
(Master)

"Lavender"
(Rehearsal – Take 1)
(Rehearsal – Take 2)
(Rehearsal – Take 3)
(Take 1)
(Take 2)
(Take 4)

"Surfin' Safari"
(Takes 3–4)
(Takes 5–6)
(Take 10)
(Overdub – Take 1 on Take 6)
(Overdub – Take 2 on Take 10)
(Stereo Overdub)
(Master)

Disc two
"Surfer Girl"
(Take 1)
(Take 2)
(Take 3)
(Take 4)
(Take 5)
(Take 6)
(Master)
(Overdub – Lead Vocals)

"Judy"
(Take 1)
(Take 2)
(Overdub – Takes 1–2)
(Overdub – Take 4)
(Master)
(Demo – April 1962 Guitar Solo)

"Beach Boy Stomp"
(Take 1)
(Rehearsal – Take 2)
(Overdub – Take 1 on Take 1)
(Overdub – Take 2 on Take 1)
(Master)

"Barbie"
(Overdub – Take 1)
(Overdub – Takes 2–4)
(Overdub – Take 5)
(Overdub – Take 7)
(Single Master)
(Album Master)

"What Is a Young Girl Made Of"
(Demo)
(Overdub – Take 1)
(Overdub – Take 3)
(Overdub – Takes 4–5)
(Overdub – Take 6)
(Overdub – Take 7)
(Master)

References

External links
 

2016 compilation albums
The Beach Boys compilation albums
Omnivore Recordings albums